Jazan Economic City is an economic city in the Jizan Province of the Kingdom of Saudi Arabia, with a focus on the energy and manufacturing industries. Arab News reported in January 2011 that when the city is completed, an estimated 500,000 new jobs will be created.

The Province of Jazan lies in the south west section of the Kingdom of Saudi Arabia. It has a population of approximately 1.2 million and covers an area of 40,000 km2 including some 5,000 villages and cities. Jizan, is home to the Port of Jizan, Saudi Arabia’s third most important port on the Red Sea. It is situated on the southern Red Sea coast with a coastline of almost 300 km and is very close to the main east and west sea trade routes to Europe, the Far East and Persian Gulf. The Farasan Islands, Saudi Arabia’s first protected wildlife area, is home to the endangered Arabian gazelle and, in winter, receives migratory birds from Europe. Its plains are noted for the production of coffee beans and grain crops, like barley millet and wheat; and fruits, such as apples, bananas, grapes, mangoes, papayas, plums and citrus varieties.

Overview
Jazan Economic City's development is based upon the philosophy of symbiotic development, incorporating co-existing uses to the benefit of each of the components and the environment. Industries would be chosen to enhance the relationship rather than be developed in isolation. The primary anchors of port, power and desalination, oil, aluminium, steel and copper provide strong downstream opportunities with industries as diverse as pharmaceuticals, food processing and high value agritech producers within a growing regional environment. Jazan Economic City is ideally placed at the mouth of the Red Sea to service markets in Europe, Asia and East Africa as well as to receive raw materials from the surrounding countries that are currently not well served with processing and manufacturing facilities.

Masterplan proposal
Jazan Economic City focuses on four areas: heavy industries, secondary industries, human capital and lifestyle. The proposed city will provide an environment for key industries, technology exchanges, commerce and trade, employment opportunities, education and training, housing and a broad spectrum of socio-economic activities for a projected population of 300,000 people.

Development
The primary developers involved in the construction of the city are MMC Corporation Berhad and Saudi Binladin Group. It was reported in September 2010 that Jazan Economic City was approximately 30% completed at that time.

Development site

Location
JEC is strategically located in the Province of Jazan, southwest of the Kingdom of Saudi Arabia, with a population of approximately 1.2 million and covering an area of 40,000 km2.
Its major city, Jizan, is home to the Port of Jizan, Saudi Arabia’s third most important port on the Red Sea.
JEC is situated on the coastline of the Red Sea, close to the main east and west sea trade routes to Europe, the Far East and the khalij Gulf. The city’s location provides significant opportunities for investment and facilitates the transportation of goods and cargo.

Site connectivity plan
Jazan Economic City will not only be located at the confluence of available raw materials and abundant labour source, but also sit along the main Red Sea shipping route. Facilitating its high connectivity and accessibility will be its proximity to the new International Airport located 60 km south; a new proposed road running east; as well as the future rail connection to Jeddah, situated approximately 600 km northwest.

Site analysis
The proposed site for Jazan Economic City is bounded by the Red Sea waterfront on the west, a new proposed road on the east that leads to Jizan City, and an existing road on the north that leads to the neighbouring Baysh Town 24 km away. Further up north is the nature park reserve - Baysh Park - that provides a contrasting landscape amidst the uniform desert environment. This green park along the coastline is a protected area of importance for the preservation of native wildlife, flora, and fauna. Measuring approximately 12 km x 8 km (excluding proposed land reclamation works over an existing swamp, thus yielding a final site of 103 km2), the site is generally level with wind coming in a north-westerly, south-easterly direction.

Land use
Commercial, residential, community and industrial components are arranged in graduating concentric circles with the regional business hub  Commercial Business District (CBD) Centre  forming the core of the city. The commercial component is ringed by residential, community and industrial components respectively in graduating circular belts. The primary industries are situated southwards with an internal utility corridor connecting the proposed road to Jazan city. The secondary industries are between the primary industry and high-tech industry near the workers' housing.

Power plant
The power and desalination plant are planned to be next to the coastline on the south side, consisting of the main power plant, desalination plant, associated balance-of-plant, electrical substation and fuel oil storage facilities. Using a steam cycle technology firing on Arabian crude oil, the power plant will be built with sufficient capacity to provide for the power needs of the Economic City with excess capacity to be sold to the grid.

The desalination plant will be able to provide about 500,000 cubic meters per day of potable water to cater to the internal requirements of the Economic City as well as to supply to the distribution network.

Port
The establishment of the port is fundamental to the establishment of Jazan Economic City.

See also
 King Abdullah bin Abdulaziz

References

External links
 Official website (17-February-2020)
 
 
  
 

 

Planned cities
Economy of Saudi Arabia
Populated places in Jizan Province
Special economic zones
Planned cities in Saudi Arabia